Ralph Staub (April 11, 1928 – January 1, 2022) was an American football player and coach.  He served as the head football coach at the University of Cincinnati from 1977 to 1980, compiling a record of 14–28–2.

Head coaching record

References

1928 births
2022 deaths
American football ends
Akron Zips football coaches
Cincinnati Bearcats football coaches
Cincinnati Bearcats football players
Dallas Cowboys scouts
Houston Oilers coaches
Northwestern Wildcats football coaches
Ohio State Buckeyes football coaches
United States Football League coaches
High school football coaches in Ohio
Players of American football from Cincinnati